Pierre Petiteau (14 May 1899 – 9 April 1974) was a French rugby union player who competed in the 1920 Summer Olympics. In 1920 he won the silver medal as member of the French team.

References

External links
Profile at databaseOlympics.com

1899 births
1974 deaths
French rugby union players
Olympic rugby union players of France
Rugby union players at the 1920 Summer Olympics
Olympic silver medalists for France
Medalists at the 1920 Summer Olympics
Sportspeople from Gironde
Racing 92 players
Stade Bordelais players
Rugby union hookers